The Kilimanjaro shrew (Crocidura monax) is a species of mammal in the family Soricidae. It is found in Kenya and Tanzania.

References

Crocidura
Mammals described in 1910
Taxa named by Oldfield Thomas
Taxonomy articles created by Polbot